James the Great, also known as James, son of Zebedee, Saint James the Great, Saint James the Greater, Saint James the Elder, or Saint Jacob (Aramaic ܝܥܩܘܒ ܒܪ ܙܒܕܝ, Arabic يعقوب, Hebrew בן זבדי , Yaʿăqōḇ, Latin Iacobus Maior, Greek Ἰάκωβος τοῦ Ζεβεδαίου Iákōbos tû Zebedaíou; died AD 44), was one of the Twelve Apostles of Jesus. According to the New Testament, he was the second of the apostles to die (after Judas Iscariot), and the first to be martyred. Saint James is the patron saint of Spain and, according to tradition, his remains are held in Santiago de Compostela in Galicia.

In the New Testament
The son of Zebedee and Salome, James is styled "the Greater" to distinguish him from the Apostle James "the Less", with "greater" meaning older or taller, rather than more important. James the Great was the brother of John the Apostle.

James is described as one of the first disciples to join Jesus. The Synoptic Gospels state that James and John were with their father by the seashore when Jesus called them to follow him. James, along with his brother John and Peter, formed an informal triumvirate among the Twelve Apostles. Jesus allowed them to be the only apostles present at three particular occasions during his public ministry, the Raising of Jairus' daughter, Transfiguration of Jesus  and Agony in the Garden of Gethsemane. James and John (or, in another tradition, their mother) asked Jesus to grant them seats on his right and left in his glory. Jesus rebuked them, asking if they were ready to drink from the cup he was going to drink from and saying the honor was not even for him to grant. The other apostles were annoyed with them. James and his brother wanted to call down fire on a Samaritan town, but were rebuked by Jesus.

The Acts of the Apostles records that "Herod the king" (usually identified with Herod Agrippa) had James executed by the sword. Nixon suggests that this may have been caused by James's fiery temper, in which he and his brother earned the nickname Boanerges or "Sons of Thunder". F. F. Bruce contrasts this story to that of the Liberation of Saint Peter, and writes that the proposition that "James should die while Peter should escape" is a "mystery of divine providence".

Veneration

In the Catholic tradition, Saint James is the patron saint of Spain and, according to legend, his remains are held in Santiago de Compostela in Galicia. This name Santiago is the local evolution of Latin genitive Sancti Iacobi, "(church or sanctuary) of Saint James" (evolved into a personal name in Spanish, and also in Portuguese -Tiago-, with its derivatives Diego/Diogo). The traditional pilgrimage to the grave of the saint, known as the "Way of St. James", has been the most popular pilgrimage for Western European Catholics from the Early Middle Ages onwards, although its modern revival and popularity stem from Walter Starkie's 1957 book, The Road to Santiago. The Pilgrims of St. James. Officially, 327,378 pilgrims registered in 2018 as having completed the final  walk ( by bicycle) to Santiago to qualify for a Compostela. When 25 July falls on a Sunday, it is a "Holy Year" (an ) and a special east door is opened for entrance into Santiago Cathedral. Jubilee years follow a 6-5-6-11 pattern (except when the last year of a century is not a leap year, which can yield a gap of 7 or 12 years). In the 2004 Holy Year, 179,944 pilgrims received a Compostela. In the 2010 Holy Year the number had risen to 272,412. The most recent such Holy Year was 2021; the next will be 2027.

The feast day of St. James is celebrated on 25 July on the liturgical calendars of the Roman Catholic, Anglican, Lutheran and certain other Protestant churches. He is commemorated on 30 April in the Orthodox Christian liturgical calendar (for those churches which follow the traditional Julian Calendar, 30 April currently falls on 13 May of the modern Gregorian Calendar). The national day of Galicia is also celebrated on 25 July: St James is its patron saint.

James the Apostle is remembered in the Church of England with a Festival on 25 July.

Jerusalem
The site of martyrdom is located within the Armenian Apostolic Cathedral of St. James in the Armenian Quarter of Jerusalem. The Chapel of St. James the Great, located to the left of the sanctuary, is the traditional place where he was martyred, when King Agrippa ordered him to be beheaded (Acts 12:1–2). His head is believed to be buried under the altar, marked by a piece of red marble and surrounded by six votive lamps.

Spain

Mission in Spain and burial at Compostela

The 12th century Historia Compostelana commissioned by Diego Gelmírez provides a summary of the legend of St. James, as it was believed at Compostela at that time. Two propositions are central to the legend: first, that James preached the gospel in Hispania as well as in the Holy Land; second, that after his martyrdom at the hands of Herod Agrippa, his followers carried his body by sea to Hispania, where they landed at Padrón on the coast of Galicia, then carried it over land for burial at Santiago de Compostela.

The translation of his relics from Judaea to Galicia in the northwest of Hispania was accomplished by a series of miraculous events: his decapitated body was taken up by angels and sailed in a rudderless, unattended boat to Iria Flavia in Hispania, where a massive rock closed around his body, which was later removed to Compostela.

According to ancient local tradition, on 2 January AD 40, the Virgin Mary appeared to James on the bank of the Ebro River at Caesaraugusta, while he was preaching the Gospel in Hispania. She appeared upon a pillar, and that pillar is conserved and venerated within the present Basilica of Our Lady of the Pillar, in Zaragoza, Spain. Following that apparition, St. James returned to Judaea, where he was beheaded by Herod Agrippa I in AD 44.

The tradition at Compostela placed the discovery of the relics of the saint in the time of king Alfonso II (791–842) and of bishop Theodemir of Iria. These traditions were the basis for the pilgrimage route that began to be established in the 9th century, and the shrine dedicated to James at Santiago de Compostela became a famous pilgrimage site within the Christian world. The Way of St. James is a network of routes that cross Western Europe and arrive at Santiago de Compostela through northern Spain.

Controversy

According to early Church tradition, James suffered martyrdom in Jerusalem in AD 44. The suggestion began to be made from the 9th century that, as well as evangelizing in Hispania, James' body was brought to and is buried in Compostela. A rival tradition places the relics of the apostle in the church of St. Saturnin at Toulouse.

The legend of Saint James' burial in Spain is rejected by numerous modern scholars such as Louis Duchesne and T. E. Kendrick as pious fiction. According to Kendrick, even if one admits the existence of miracles, James' presence in Spain is impossible. Apart from the late appearance of the legend, the Catholic Encyclopedia noted several bases for doubts about this tradition:
 The Bollandists, however, defended the tradition, as noted in Acta Sanctorum (July parts VI and VII). A belief in the authenticity of the relics at Compostela was also asserted by Pope Leo XIII in his 1884 bull Omnipotens Deus.

Medieval "Santiago Matamoros" legend

An even later tradition states that he miraculously appeared to fight for the Christian army during the legendary battle of Clavijo, and was henceforth called Santiago Matamoros (Saint James the Moor-slayer). ¡Santiago, y cierra, España! ("St. James and strike for Spain") was the traditional battle cry of medieval Spanish (Christian) armies. Miguel de Cervantes has Don Quixote explaining that "the great knight of the russet cross was given by God to Spain as patron and protector".

A similar miracle is related to San Millán. The possibility that a cult of James was instituted to supplant the Galician cult of Priscillian (executed in 385) who was widely venerated across the north of Iberia as a martyr (at the hands of the local bishops, rather than as a heretic) should not be overlooked. This was cautiously raised by Henry Chadwick in his book on Priscillian; it is not the traditional Roman Catholic view. The Catholic Encyclopedia of 1908, however, is quite cautious about the origins of the cult (see above at "Controversy").

Emblem

James' emblem was the scallop shell (or "cockle shell"), and pilgrims to his shrine often wore that symbol on their hats or clothes. The French term for a scallop is coquille St. Jacques, which means "cockle (or mollusc) of [St.] Jacob". The German word for a scallop is Jakobsmuschel, which means "Jacob's mussel (or clam)"; the Dutch word is Jacobsschelp, meaning "Jacob's shell". In Danish and with the same meaning as in Dutch the word is Ibskal, Ib being a Danish version of the name Jakob and skal meaning shell.

Military Order of Santiago
The military Order of Santiago, named after Saint Tiago or Saint James, was founded in Spain in the 12th century to fight the Moors. Later, as in other orders of chivalry, the membership became a mark of honor.

Latter-day Saints
The Church of Jesus Christ of Latter-day Saints teaches that in 1829 John the Baptist and later the Apostles James, Peter and John appeared as heavenly messengers to Joseph Smith and Oliver Cowdery and conferred upon them both the Aaronic and the Melchizedek priesthood authority of apostolic succession, and thus exclusively on earth to their organization.

In Islam
The Quranic account of the disciples of Jesus does not include their names, numbers, or any detailed accounts of their lives. Muslim exegesis, however, more or less agrees with the New Testament list and says that the disciples included Peter, Philip, Thomas, Bartholomew, Matthew, Andrew, James, Jude, John and Simon the Zealot.

See also
 Apocryphon of James (also known as the Secret Book of James)
 Camino de Santiago
 Cathedral of St. James
 Hand of St James the Apostle
 Military Order of Saint James of the Sword
 Peter of Rates
 Saint James, son of Zebedee, patron saint archive
 James Matamoros
 St. James' Church

References

Citations

Sources

Further reading

External links

 "St. James the Great, Apostle", Butler's Lives of the Saints
 The Life, Miracles and Martyrdom of St. James the Great: Apostle and Martyr of the Christian Church
 The Way of St. James Guide for the pilgrimage to Santiago de Compostela following St. James's footsteps.
 Apostle James the Brother of St John the Theologian Orthodox icon and synaxarion
 History
 St. James the Greater, Apostle at the Christian Iconography web site
 St. James the Greater from Caxton's translation of the Golden Legend
 The patron saint of Spain, celebrated in Santiago in July
 Translations of the given name James in the world's languages

Year of birth unknown
44 deaths
1st-century Christian martyrs
Ancient Jewish fishers
Angelic visionaries
Anglican saints
Christian martyrs executed by decapitation
Christian missionaries in Spain
Christian saints from the New Testament
Marian visionaries
People from Bethsaida
Saints from the Holy Land
Twelve Apostles